John Donnan Fredericks (September 10, 1869 – August 26, 1945) was an American lawyer and politician who served two terms as a U.S. Representative from California from 1923 to 1927.

Biography
Born in Burgettstown, Pennsylvania, Fredericks attended the public schools and Washington and Jefferson College, Washington, Pennsylvania. He studied law and was admitted to the bar in 1896 and commenced practice in Los Angeles, California. He served as an adjutant in the Seventh Regiment, California Volunteer Infantry, during the Spanish–American War in 1898. He served as district attorney of Los Angeles County from 1903 to 1915. He was the unsuccessful Republican candidate for Governor of California in 1914 against popular governor Hiram Johnson, who had been elected under the Republican Party banner 4 years previous but now ran under the short-lived Progressive Party of Theodore Roosevelt.

Congress 
Fredericks was elected as a Republican to the Sixty-eighth Congress to fill the vacancy caused by the death of Henry Z. Osborne.
He was reelected to the Sixty-ninth Congress and served from May 1, 1923, to March 3, 1927.
He was not a candidate for renomination in 1926.

Later career and death 
He resumed the practice of law at Los Angeles where he died August 26, 1945. He was interred in Forest Lawn Memorial Park.

References

External links

1869 births
1945 deaths
American military personnel of the Spanish–American War
District attorneys in California
United States Army officers
Lawyers from Los Angeles
People from Washington County, Pennsylvania
Washington & Jefferson College alumni
Republican Party members of the United States House of Representatives from California
Burials at Forest Lawn Memorial Park (Glendale)
Military personnel from Pennsylvania